Vilija is a Lithuanian feminine given name. Individuals with the name Vilija include:
Vilija Aleknaitė-Abramikienė (born 1957), Lithuanian politician
Vilija Blinkevičiūtė (born 1960), Lithuanian lawyer and politician
Vilija Matačiūnaitė (born 1986), Lithuanian singer
Vilija Sereikaitė (born 1987), Lithuanian racing cyclist
Vilija Pilibaitytė (aka Mia; born 1983), Lithuanian singer and television host

Lithuanian feminine given names